{{Speciesbox
| image = Halielloides nitidus 001.png
| image_caption = 
| taxon = Halielloides nitidus
| authority = Verrill, 1884
| synonyms_ref = 
| synonyms = 
 Eulima verrilliana  Bush, 1909 
 Eulimella nitida  Verrill, 1884 
 Halielloides ingolfiana  Bouchet & Warén, 1986 
}}Halielloides nitidus is a species of sea snail, a marine gastropod mollusk in the family Eulimidae. This species, along with Halielloides fragilis and Halielloides verrilliana, belongs in the gastropod genus Halielloides''.

Description

The size of the shell measures approximately 3 mm in length and can be located at depths of roughly 900 m below sea level.

Distribution

This species occurs in the following locations:

 European waters (ERMS scope)

References

External links
 To World Register of Marine Species

Eulimidae
Gastropods described in 1884